SG Dynamo Erfurt is a German sports club which became defunct after reunification.
It existed from 1966 until 1989.

See also 
Sportvereinigung (SV) Dynamo

References 

Football clubs in East Germany
Sport in Erfurt
Defunct football clubs in Germany
Defunct football clubs in Thuringia
SV Dynamo
1966 establishments in East Germany
1989 disestablishments in East Germany
Association football clubs established in 1966
Association football clubs disestablished in 1989
Football clubs in Germany